Smoky Hollow Township is a township in Cass County, Minnesota, United States. The population was 61 as of the 2000 census.

Geography
According to the United States Census Bureau, the township has a total area of 36.1 square miles (93.4 km), of which 34.8 square miles (90.2 km) is land and 1.3 square miles (3.3 km) (3.52%) is water.

Lakes
 Ahsebun Lake
 Baker Lake
 Buck Lake
 Cedar Lake
 Kelly Lake
 Little Goose Lake
 Little Thunder Lake
 Lake On Three
 Loon Lake
 Michaud Lake (east three-quarters)
 Whiskey Lake
 White Oak Lake
 Windy Lake

Adjacent townships
 Lima Township (north)
 Beulah Township (south)
 Crooked Lake Township (southwest)
 Thunder Lake Township (west)

Cemeteries
The township contains Lakeview Cemetery.

Demographics
As of the census of 2000, there were 61 people, 28 households, and 18 families residing in the township. The population density was 1.8 people per square mile (0.7/km). There were 109 housing units at an average density of 3.1/sq mi (1.2/km). The racial makeup of the township was 98.36% White and 1.64% Native American.

There were 28 households, out of which 21.4% had children under the age of 18 living with them, 46.4% were married couples living together, 3.6% had a female householder with no husband present, and 35.7% were non-families. 32.1% of all households were made up of individuals, and 10.7% had someone living alone who was 65 years of age or older. The average household size was 2.18 and the average family size was 2.78.

In the township the population was spread out, with 21.3% under the age of 18, 3.3% from 18 to 24, 16.4% from 25 to 44, 44.3% from 45 to 64, and 14.8% who were 65 years of age or older. The median age was 49 years. For every 100 females, there were 154.2 males. For every 100 females age 18 and over, there were 140.0 males.

The median income for a household in the township was $21,875, and the median income for a family was $21,875. Males had a median income of $65,417 versus $13,750 for females. The per capita income for the township was $15,042. There were no families and 10.4% of the population living below the poverty line, including no under eighteens and 18.8% of those over 64.

References
 United States National Atlas
 United States Census Bureau 2007 TIGER/Line Shapefiles
 United States Board on Geographic Names (GNIS)

Townships in Cass County, Minnesota
Brainerd, Minnesota micropolitan area
Townships in Minnesota